Tribonanthes australis is the type species of the genus Tribonanthes in the bloodwort family, Haemodoraceae in south western Western Australia.

It was first described by Stephan Endlicher in 1839. It is a tuberous perennial herb growing from 0.15m to 0.4 m high, in peaty, black sand and sandy clay soils in swamps and areas which are seasonally wet.  It flowers from August to November.

References

External links

australis
Haemodoraceae
Commelinales of Australia
Angiosperms of Western Australia
Endemic flora of Western Australia
Taxa named by Stephan Endlicher